This is a list of Baldwin Wallace Yellow Jackets football players in the NFL Draft.

Key

Selections

References

Lists of National Football League draftees by college football team

Baldwin Wallace Yellow Jackets NFL Draft